Branching may refer to:

 Branching (linguistics), the general tendency towards a given order of words within sentences and smaller grammatical units within sentences
 Branching (polymer chemistry), the attachment of side chains to a polymer's backbone chain
 Branching (revision control), a way of duplicating an object under revision control

See also
 Branching process, a kind of stochastic process
 Branch (disambiguation)